Caricea is a genus of house flies, in the family Muscidae. There are at least 30 described species in Caricea.

Species

References

Further reading

External links

 

Muscidae
Muscoidea genera